Waranga was an electoral district of the Legislative Assembly in the Australian state of Victoria from 1904 to 1945.

Members for Waranga

Election results

References

Former electoral districts of Victoria (Australia)
1904 establishments in Australia
1945 disestablishments in Australia